Highland Express Airways was an airline based in Scotland. Its main base was at Glasgow Prestwick Airport. It ceased operations in 1987.

History 
The airline was formed in 1984 by Randolph Fields and operated a daily transatlantic nonstop service between Glasgow and Newark.
Fields had been involved with the concept and start up of Virgin Atlantic. it was Fields who brought Branson to the table as backer.

Highland Express planned to officially launch on the day of the Scottish International Airshow in Glasgow on Saturday, 30 May 1987 to Newark and Toronto. However, the first scheduled flight using a Highland Express flight number actually took place a few days earlier. That flight used a hired Cargolux Boeing 747-200 as the airline's own Boeing 747 had not yet been delivered. Highland Express cabin crew were specially trained to operate this version of the 747 in time for this inaugural flight and wore the airline's tartan and green uniforms. The founder, Randolph Fields was on board, and to celebrate the inaugural flight complimentary refreshments were served.

Many of the passengers with return tickets on that flight were forced to return using the Northwest Airlines service with the booking paid for by Highland Express. Things continued to go wrong when the Toronto route licence was not forthcoming and their sole Boeing 747 was delivered weeks late.

Operations finally began with flight VY201 from London Stansted Airport to Newark via Glasgow on Tuesday, 30 June 1987. Operations ex Birmingham were operated from Saturday, 4 July 1987 on flight VY211. Initially, four Stansted and three Birmingham rotations were planned weekly. However, after a few weeks the Monday morning flight from Newark to Stansted via Prestwick routed onto Brussels for maintenance with Sabena, returning on a Tuesday.

Cabin Crew for the start up operation were recruited locally in Ayrshire and Glasgow. Senior crew members were recruited from British crew already working for airlines around the globe bringing a wealth of experience. Cabin Crew Manager, Yvonne Sadler was formally management with Gulf Air. Sadler was also part of the management team involved with the start up of Emirates based in Dubai in 1985 until she joined Highland Express.

Passengers could purchase a one-way economy ticket from Prestwick to Stansted for £19 and could travel first class for an extra fee. This made Highland Express the first scheduled low-cost carrier from Prestwick, Stansted and Birmingham.

With passenger numbers not meeting targets and debts mounting, a short lived service from Gatwick Airport to Newark via Prestwick was launched in November. But some three weeks later the lessors of the aircraft, Citicorp repossessed the aircraft which was in Brussels on maintenance.

Scheduled routes in 1987 

According to the 30 May 1987 Highland Express system timetable, the airline was operating scheduled round trip Boeing 747 passenger service on the following routes:

 VY 201/202:  London Stansted Airport (STN) - Glasgow Prestwick Airport (PIK) - New York Newark Airport (EWR) - operated four days a week

 VY 211/212:  Birmingham (BHX) - Glasgow Prestwick Airport (PIK) - New York Newark Airport (EWR) - operated three days a week

Fleet 
The Highland Express fleet consisted of one aircraft which was eventually bought by Virgin Atlantic before being scrapped.

1 Boeing 747-100 (G-HIHO)

See also
 List of defunct airlines of the United Kingdom

References

External links

Photos of Highland Express aircraft

Defunct airlines of the United Kingdom
Defunct airlines of Scotland
Airlines established in 1984
Airlines disestablished in 1987
1984 establishments in Scotland
1987 disestablishments in Scotland
British companies disestablished in 1987
British companies established in 1984